Decaborane, also called decaborane(14), is the borane with the chemical formula B10H14. This white crystalline compound is one of the principal boron hydride clusters, both as a reference structure and as a precursor to other boron hydrides.  It is toxic and volatile, with a foul odor.

Handling, properties and structure
The physical characteristics of decaborane(14) resemble those of naphthalene and anthracene, all three of which are volatile colorless solids. Sublimation is the common method of purification. Decaborane is highly flammable, but, like other boron hydrides, it burns with a bright green flame. It is not sensitive to moist air, although it hydrolyzes in boiling water, releasing hydrogen and giving a solution of boric acid. It is soluble in cold water as well as a variety of non-polar and moderately polar solvents.

In decaborane, the B10 framework resembles an incomplete octadecahedron. Each boron has one "radial" hydride, and four boron atoms near the open part of the cluster feature extra hydrides. In the language of cluster chemistry, the structure is classified as "nido".

Synthesis and reactions
It is commonly synthesized via the pyrolysis of smaller boron hydride clusters. For example, pyrolysis of B2H6 or B5H9 gives decaborane, with loss of H2.  On a laboratory scale, sodium borohydride is treated with boron trifluoride to give NaB11H14, which is acidified to release borane and hydrogen gas.

It reacts with Lewis bases (L) such as CH3CN and Et2S, to form adducts:
B10H14 + 2 L → B10H12L2 + H2

These species, which are classified as "arachno" clusters, in turn react with acetylene to give the "closo" ortho-carborane:
B10H12·2L + C2H2 → C2B10H12 + 2 L + H2

Decaborane(14) is a weak Brønsted acid. Monodeprotonation generates the anion [B10H13]−, with again a nido structure.

In the Brellochs reaction, decaborane is converted to arachno-CB9H14−:
B10H14 +  CH2O  + 2 OH−  +  H2O  →  CB9H14−  +  B(OH)4−  +  H2

Applications
Decaborane has no significant applications, although the compound has often been investigated.

In 2018, LPP Fusion announced plans for using decaborane in its next round of fusion experiments. Decaborane has been assessed for low energy ion implantation of boron in the manufacture of semiconductors. It has also been considered for plasma-assisted chemical vapor deposition for the manufacture of boron-containing thin films. In fusion research, the neutron-absorbing nature of boron has led to the use of these thin boron-rich films to "boronize" the walls of the tokamak vacuum vessel to reduce recycling of particles and impurities into the plasma and improve overall performance.

Decaborane was also developed as an additive to special high-performance rocket fuels. Its derivates were investigated as well, e.g. ethyl decaborane.

Decaborane is an effective reagent for the reductive amination of ketones and aldehydes.

Safety
Decaborane, like pentaborane, is a powerful toxin affecting the central nervous system, although decaborane is less toxic than pentaborane. It can be absorbed through skin.

Purification by sublimation require a dynamic vacuum to remove evolved gases.  Crude samples explode near 100 °C.

It forms an explosive mixture with carbon tetrachloride, which caused an often-mentioned explosion in a manufacturing facility.

References

Further reading
 
 
 
 
 

Boranes
Rocket fuels
Foul-smelling chemicals